Elitzur Eito Ashkelon is a professional basketball team based in Ashkelon in south west Israel. The club currently plays in Israeli National League. The team is named after the late Itamar Sharvit (nicknamed "Eito"), who has been Elizur Ashkelon's maintenance manager for 18 years.

History
The team was founded in 2015 after Ironi Ashkelon has been dissolved.

In the 2017–18 season, the team has been promoted to the Israeli National League after winning the Liga Artzit championship title.

In the 2018–19 season, they have qualified to the national league playoffs, where they eventually were eliminated by Hapoel Galil Elyon in the Quarterfinals.

Honours

Domestic competitions

Lower division competitions
National League Cup
Runner up : 2021, 2022
Liga Artzit  
Winners: 2018

Roster

References

External links
Facebook page 
Eurobasket page

2015 establishments in Israel
Basketball teams in Israel
Sport in Ashkelon
Israeli Basketball Premier League teams
Basketball teams established in 2015